Yekaterinovka is the name of several inhabited localities in Russia.

Altai Krai
As of 2010, two rural localities in Altai Krai bear this name:
Yekaterinovka, Kulundinsky District, Altai Krai, a selo in Ananyevsky Selsoviet of Kulundinsky District
Yekaterinovka, Slavgorodsky District, Altai Krai, a selo in Selektsionny Selsoviet of Slavgorodsky District

Astrakhan Oblast
As of 2010, one rural locality in Astrakhan Oblast bears this name:
Yekaterinovka, Astrakhan Oblast, a selo in Fedorovsky Selsoviet of Yenotayevsky District

Republic of Bashkortostan
As of 2010, two rural localities in the Republic of Bashkortostan bear this name:
Yekaterinovka, Belebeyevsky District, Republic of Bashkortostan, a village in Bazhenovsky Selsoviet of Belebeyevsky District
Yekaterinovka, Ishimbaysky District, Republic of Bashkortostan, a village in Yanurusovsky Selsoviet of Ishimbaysky District

Belgorod Oblast
As of 2010, one rural locality in Belgorod Oblast bears this name:
Yekaterinovka, Belgorod Oblast, a khutor in Grushevsky Rural Okrug of Volokonovsky District

Bryansk Oblast
As of 2010, one rural locality in Bryansk Oblast bears this name:
Yekaterinovka, Bryansk Oblast, a settlement in Krasninsky Selsoviet of Brasovsky District

Chelyabinsk Oblast
As of 2010, one rural locality in Chelyabinsk Oblast bears this name:
Yekaterinovka, Chelyabinsk Oblast, a selo in Mesedinsky Selsoviet of Katav-Ivanovsky District

Kaluga Oblast
As of 2010, five rural localities in Kaluga Oblast bear this name:
Yekaterinovka, Spas-Demensky District, Kaluga Oblast, a village in Spas-Demensky District
Yekaterinovka, Tarussky District, Kaluga Oblast, a village in Tarussky District
Yekaterinovka (Chemodanovo Rural Settlement), Yukhnovsky District, Kaluga Oblast, a village in Yukhnovsky District; municipally, a part of Chemodanovo Rural Settlement of that district
Yekaterinovka (Pogorelovka Rural Settlement), Yukhnovsky District, Kaluga Oblast, a village in Yukhnovsky District; municipally, a part of Pogorelovka Rural Settlement of that district
Yekaterinovka, Zhukovsky District, Kaluga Oblast, a village in Zhukovsky District

Krasnodar Krai
As of 2010, one rural locality in Krasnodar Krai bears this name:
Yekaterinovka, Krasnodar Krai, a selo in Yekaterinovsky Rural Okrug of Shcherbinovsky District

Krasnoyarsk Krai
As of 2010, one rural locality in Krasnoyarsk Krai bears this name:
Yekaterinovka, Krasnoyarsk Krai, a selo in Yekaterininsky Selsoviet of Idrinsky District

Kursk Oblast
As of 2010, six rural localities in Kursk Oblast bear this name:
Yekaterinovka, Kursky District, Kursk Oblast, a village in Novoposelenovsky Selsoviet of Kursky District
Yekaterinovka, Lgovsky District, Kursk Oblast, a village in Maleyevsky Selsoviet of Lgovsky District
Yekaterinovka, Manturovsky District, Kursk Oblast, a village in Repetskoplatavsky Selsoviet of Manturovsky District
Yekaterinovka, Krestishchensky Selsoviet, Sovetsky District, Kursk Oblast, a village in Krestishchensky Selsoviet of Sovetsky District
Yekaterinovka, Natalyinsky Selsoviet, Sovetsky District, Kursk Oblast, a village in Natalyinsky Selsoviet of Sovetsky District
Yekaterinovka, Sovetsky Selsoviet, Sovetsky District, Kursk Oblast, a village in Sovetsky Selsoviet of Sovetsky District

Leningrad Oblast
As of 2010, one rural locality in Leningrad Oblast bears this name:
Yekaterinovka, Leningrad Oblast, a village in Kuyvozovskoye Settlement Municipal Formation of Vsevolozhsky District

Lipetsk Oblast
As of 2010, five rural localities in Lipetsk Oblast bear this name:
Yekaterinovka, Dobrovsky District, Lipetsk Oblast, a selo in Yekaterinovsky Selsoviet of Dobrovsky District
Yekaterinovka, Dolgorukovsky District, Lipetsk Oblast, a village in Dolgorukovsky Selsoviet of Dolgorukovsky District
Yekaterinovka, Krasninsky District, Lipetsk Oblast, a village in Sukhodolsky Selsoviet of Krasninsky District
Yekaterinovka, Usmansky District, Lipetsk Oblast, a selo in Breslavsky Selsoviet of Usmansky District
Yekaterinovka, Yeletsky District, Lipetsk Oblast, a village in Bolsheizvalsky Selsoviet of Yeletsky District

Republic of Mordovia
As of 2010, one rural locality in the Republic of Mordovia bears this name:
Yekaterinovka, Republic of Mordovia, a village in Skryabinsky Selsoviet of Lyambirsky District

Moscow Oblast
As of 2010, one rural locality in Moscow Oblast bears this name:
Yekaterinovka, Moscow Oblast, a village in Nudolskoye Rural Settlement of Klinsky District

Nizhny Novgorod Oblast
As of 2010, two rural localities in Nizhny Novgorod Oblast bear this name:
Yekaterinovka, Krasnooktyabrsky District, Nizhny Novgorod Oblast, a village in Kechasovsky Selsoviet of Krasnooktyabrsky District
Yekaterinovka, Sechenovsky District, Nizhny Novgorod Oblast, a village in Lipovsky Selsoviet of Sechenovsky District

Omsk Oblast
As of 2010, three rural localities in Omsk Oblast bear this name:
Yekaterinovka, Moskalensky District, Omsk Oblast, a selo in Yekaterinovsky Rural Okrug of Moskalensky District
Yekaterinovka, Tevrizsky District, Omsk Oblast, a selo in Yekaterininsky Rural Okrug of Tevrizsky District
Yekaterinovka, Ust-Ishimsky District, Omsk Oblast, a village in Nikolsky Rural Okrug of Ust-Ishimsky District

Orenburg Oblast
As of 2010, five rural localities in Orenburg Oblast bear this name:
Yekaterinovka, Buzuluksky District, Orenburg Oblast, a selo in Derzhavinsky Selsoviet of Buzuluksky District
Yekaterinovka, Kvarkensky District, Orenburg Oblast, a selo in Krasnoyarsky Settlement Council of Kvarkensky District
Yekaterinovka, Saraktashsky District, Orenburg Oblast, a selo in Kairovsky Selsoviet of Saraktashsky District
Yekaterinovka, Sharlyksky District, Orenburg Oblast, a settlement in Ratchinsky Selsoviet of Sharlyksky District
Yekaterinovka, Tyulgansky District, Orenburg Oblast, a selo in Blagodarnovsky Selsoviet of Tyulgansky District

Oryol Oblast
As of 2010, two rural localities in Oryol Oblast bear this name:
Yekaterinovka, Kolpnyansky District, Oryol Oblast, a village in Karlovsky Selsoviet of Kolpnyansky District
Yekaterinovka, Livensky District, Oryol Oblast, a selo in Nikolsky Selsoviet of Livensky District

Penza Oblast
As of 2010, one rural locality in Penza Oblast bears this name:
Yekaterinovka, Penza Oblast, a selo in Zasursky Selsoviet of Luninsky District

Perm Krai
As of 2010, one rural locality in Perm Krai bears this name:
Yekaterinovka, Perm Krai, a village in Uinsky District

Primorsky Krai
As of 2010, one rural locality in Primorsky Krai bears this name:
Yekaterinovka, Primorsky Krai, a selo in Partizansky District

Rostov Oblast
As of 2010, three rural localities in Rostov Oblast bear this name:
Yekaterinovka, Matveyevo-Kurgansky District, Rostov Oblast, a selo in Yekaterinovskoye Rural Settlement of Matveyevo-Kurgansky District
Yekaterinovka, Millerovsky District, Rostov Oblast, a khutor in Krivorozhskoye Rural Settlement of Millerovsky District
Yekaterinovka, Salsky District, Rostov Oblast, a selo in Yekaterinovskoye Rural Settlement of Salsky District

Ryazan Oblast
As of 2010, three rural localities in Ryazan Oblast bear this name:
Yekaterinovka, Miloslavsky District, Ryazan Oblast, a village in Pryamoglyadovsky Rural Okrug of Miloslavsky District
Yekaterinovka, Putyatinsky District, Ryazan Oblast, a selo in Yekaterinovsky Rural Okrug of Putyatinsky District
Yekaterinovka, Sapozhkovsky District, Ryazan Oblast, a village in Korovkinsky Rural Okrug of Sapozhkovsky District

Samara Oblast
As of 2010, five rural localities in Samara Oblast bear this name:
Yekaterinovka, Bezenchuksky District, Samara Oblast, a selo in Bezenchuksky District
Yekaterinovka, Kinel-Cherkassky District, Samara Oblast, a selo in Kinel-Cherkassky District
Yekaterinovka (selo), Krasnoyarsky District, Samara Oblast, a selo in Krasnoyarsky District
Yekaterinovka (village), Krasnoyarsky District, Samara Oblast, a village in Krasnoyarsky District
Yekaterinovka, Privolzhsky District, Samara Oblast, a selo in Privolzhsky District

Saratov Oblast
As of 2010, three inhabited localities in Saratov Oblast bear this name:

Urban localities
Yekaterinovka, Yekaterinovsky District, Saratov Oblast, a work settlement in Yekaterinovsky District

Rural localities
Yekaterinovka, Novoburassky District, Saratov Oblast, a village in Novoburassky District
Yekaterinovka, Rtishchevsky District, Saratov Oblast, a village in Rtishchevsky District

Smolensk Oblast
As of 2010, one rural locality in Smolensk Oblast bears this name:
Yekaterinovka, Smolensk Oblast, a village in Tesovskoye Rural Settlement of Novoduginsky District

Sverdlovsk Oblast
As of 2010, one rural locality in Sverdlovsk Oblast bears this name:
Yekaterinovka, Sverdlovsk Oblast, a village in Krasnoufimsky District

Tambov Oblast
As of 2010, four rural localities in Tambov Oblast bear this name:
Yekaterinovka, Kirsanovsky District, Tambov Oblast, a village in Leninsky Selsoviet of Kirsanovsky District
Yekaterinovka, Morshansky District, Tambov Oblast, a selo in Yekaterinovsky Selsoviet of Morshansky District
Yekaterinovka, Pichayevsky District, Tambov Oblast, a village in Bolshelomovissky Selsoviet of Pichayevsky District
Yekaterinovka, Umyotsky District, Tambov Oblast, a village in Bibikovsky Selsoviet of Umyotsky District

Republic of Tatarstan
As of 2010, five rural localities in the Republic of Tatarstan bear this name:
Yekaterinovka, Novosheshminsky District, Republic of Tatarstan, a village in Novosheshminsky District
Yekaterinovka, Pestrechinsky District, Republic of Tatarstan, a selo in Pestrechinsky District
Yekaterinovka, Spassky District, Republic of Tatarstan, a selo in Spassky District
Yekaterinovka, Tyulyachinsky District, Republic of Tatarstan, a village in Tyulyachinsky District
Yekaterinovka, Yutazinsky District, Republic of Tatarstan, a settlement in Yutazinsky District

Tula Oblast
As of 2010, two rural localities in Tula Oblast bear this name:
Yekaterinovka, Yasnogorsky District, Tula Oblast, a village in Burakovskaya Rural Territory of Yasnogorsky District
Yekaterinovka, Yefremovsky District, Tula Oblast, a village in Bolsheplotavsky Rural Okrug of Yefremovsky District

Tver Oblast
As of 2010, one rural locality in Tver Oblast bears this name:
Yekaterinovka, Tver Oblast, a village in Kalyazinsky District

Tyumen Oblast
As of 2010, one rural locality in Tyumen Oblast bears this name:
Yekaterinovka, Tyumen Oblast, a village in Pervopesyanovsky Rural Okrug of Ishimsky District

Ulyanovsk Oblast
As of 2010, four rural localities in Ulyanovsk Oblast bear this name:
Yekaterinovka, Baryshsky District, Ulyanovsk Oblast, a village in Polivanovsky Rural Okrug of Baryshsky District
Yekaterinovka, Inzensky District, Ulyanovsk Oblast, a village in Oskinsky Rural Okrug of Inzensky District
Yekaterinovka, Kuzovatovsky District, Ulyanovsk Oblast, a selo in Speshnevsky Rural Okrug of Kuzovatovsky District
Yekaterinovka, Sengileyevsky District, Ulyanovsk Oblast, a selo in Tushninsky Rural Okrug of Sengileyevsky District

Vladimir Oblast
As of 2010, one rural locality in Vladimir Oblast bears this name:
Yekaterinovka, Vladimir Oblast, a village in Selivanovsky District

Voronezh Oblast
As of 2010, three rural localities in Voronezh Oblast bear this name:
Yekaterinovka, Liskinsky District, Voronezh Oblast, a sloboda in Petrovskoye Rural Settlement of Liskinsky District
Yekaterinovka, Repyovsky District, Voronezh Oblast, a khutor in Butyrskoye Rural Settlement of Repyovsky District
Yekaterinovka, Rossoshansky District, Voronezh Oblast, a selo in Lizinovskoye Rural Settlement of Rossoshansky District